Scarborough is a hillside suburb above Sumner in Christchurch, New Zealand.

Scarborough is located between Sumner and Te Onepoto / Taylors Mistake. It was named for the seaside resort in North Yorkshire, England. The first European owner of most of the land was Major Alfred Hornbrook, whose Mount Pleasant run stretched as far east as Godley Head. A small land parcel of  near present-day Nicholson Park belonged to Charles Church Haslewood, who died in May 1858 when his hunting gun discharged while he looked down the barrel.

The land was purchased by R. M. Morten, and after his death, his sons had Scarborough subdivided into 65 sections by July 1911. The first person who built in the area was Donald Patterson, a civil engineer. Patterson purchased all the land in the triangle formed by Scarborough Road and Flowers Track, and had it resurveyed into 41 sections, twice the number of the Morten brother survey.

Nicholson Park has views from a number of vantage points in this  location,  with views of Sumner and the Canterbury coastline. Flowers Track can be descended from here, and it was the main start point of the walking track along the cliff tops that formed an early connection between Sumner and Taylors Mistake. The track went past Whitewash Head and Sumner Head; the former name was first recorded by Thomas Potts in his book Out in the Open in 1882 and it is presumed that it refers to the white appearance from shag droppings. The walkway was destroyed in the two earthquakes that hit on 13 June 2011; the first had its epicentre in Taylor's Mistake, and the second had its epicentre in Sumner. Much of the cliff faces collapsed into the sea below.

Some of the land near the cliffs has been red zoned and purchased by the Canterbury Earthquake Recovery Authority. Houses on those properties are to be demolished, and the land is so unstable that drones are used to survey the land for establishing the best demolition method.

Demographics
Scarborough is part of the Sumner SA2 statistical area.

It had a population of 747 at the 2018 New Zealand census, an increase of 42 people (6.0%) since the 2013 census, and a decrease of 36 people (-4.6%) since the 2006 census. There were 285 households. There were 381 males and 363 females, giving a sex ratio of 1.05 males per female, with 108 people (14.5%) aged under 15 years, 117 (15.7%) aged 15 to 29, 390 (52.2%) aged 30 to 64, and 129 (17.3%) aged 65 or older.

Ethnicities were 96.0% European/Pākehā, 4.0% Māori, 0.4% Pacific peoples, 2.4% Asian, and 2.0% other ethnicities (totals add to more than 100% since people could identify with multiple ethnicities).

Although some people objected to giving their religion, 51.8% had no religion, 37.8% were Christian, 0.4% were Hindu, 0.4% were Buddhist and 3.6% had other religions.

Of those at least 15 years old, 279 (43.7%) people had a bachelor or higher degree, and 39 (6.1%) people had no formal qualifications. The employment status of those at least 15 was that 303 (47.4%) people were employed full-time, 117 (18.3%) were part-time, and 15 (2.3%) were unemployed.

Notes

References

External links

 Video of damage to Whitewash Head after the first of the two June 2011 Christchurch earthquakes had struck

Suburbs of Christchurch